Gulaman, in Filipino cuisine, is a bar, or powdered form, of dried agar or carrageenan used to make jelly-like desserts. In common usage, it also usually refers to the refreshment sago't gulaman, sometimes referred to as samalamig, sold at roadside stalls and vendors.

Description

Gulaman is the Filipino culinary use of agar, which is made of processed Gracilaria seaweed; or carrageenan derived from other farmed seaweed species like Eucheuma and Kappaphycus alvarezii which were first cultivated commercially in the Philippines.

It is usually sold dehydrated and formed into foot-long dry bars which are either plain or coloured. It is also commonly sold in powder form.

Uses
Gulaman bars are used in the various Filipino refreshments or desserts such as sago at gulaman, buko pandan, agar flan, halo-halo, fruit cocktail jelly, different varieties of Filipino fruit salads, black gulaman, and red gulaman.

Differences between gelatine and gulaman
The term gelatine (or "jelly") and gulaman are used synonymously in the Philippines, although they are very different products. While gelatine is an animal-derived protein, gulaman is a plant-derived carbohydrate made from seaweed. This distinction makes gulaman suitable for those who may not eat gelatine for religious or cultural reasons, such as for Muslims or vegans.

Gelatine dissolves in hot water but boiling water is necessary to dissolve gulaman. Unlike gelatine which sets at refrigerator temperature, gulaman sets at room temperature. While gelatine can melt at room temperature, it is uniquely thermo-reversible to its previous shape and form.

See also
Chondrus crispus
Kaong
List of Philippine desserts
Nata de coco
Sago
Tapioca balls

References

Philippine desserts
Edible thickening agents
Algal food ingredients
Vegan cuisine
Vegetarian dishes of the Philippines